COLAs appear in The Shapeshifter series of books by Ali Sparkes. "COLA" stands for "Children Of Limitless Ability," a name given in recognition of the children's amazing supernatural powers. There are originally 111 COLAs, including Dax Jones.

The birth of each COLA was heralded by bizarre weather phenomena, ranging anywhere from heatwaves to localized blizzards in summer. For reasons outlined below, none of the COLAs' mothers survived beyond the child's fourth birthday.

Origins
In Stirring the Storm, Dax uses an alien artifact to travel to another planet, where he learns from his aunt, Hessa, that each COLA child is the result of crossbreeding between aliens and humans:

For thousands of years, an alliance has existed between 11 alien planets collectively referred to as "The Quorat". The inhabitants of each planet possess various supernatural abilities. About fifteen years prior to the events of Stirring the Storm, the Quorat felt it was time to integrate a twelfth planet into their alliance, and after surveying many potential worlds, they eventually chose Earth. However, they realized that the human race was still to closed-minded to communicate with them on a proper level, and that if they were to simply arrive on Earth and introduce themselves, they would be greeted with fear and distrust. Therefore, they decided to send ambassadors to Earth, in order to gradually introduce humanity to some of the powers that they possessed, and broaden the minds of their soon-to-be-allies. To this end, several female inhabitants of each Quorat planet were sent to Earth and settled in Britain (chosen for its isolation as an island and because its people were viewed as being among the most tolerant the world had to offer). These women were referred to as "Seeders", and were sent to Earth via an interplanetary 'corridor', activated by a key called a 'cleftonique'. Their arrival resulted in what was referred to as a 'cleftonique aftershock', which disrupted the atmospheric patterns in the vicinity, causing strange weather phenomena. The goal of each Seeder was to find an intelligent human male to marry and mate with, the result of each such union being a COLA child. The birth of these children caused another cleftonique aftershock. However, living on another planet puts one into contact with all sorts of unfamiliar viruses, and prolonged exposure ultimately proves fatal. Females had been chosen because they would be more resistant to such problems, but the physical changes brought about by pregnancy weakened their immune systems. Therefore, all of the Seeder women fell ill and died from various natural illnesses within four years of giving birth. The human father's immunity would be passed on to the child.

Dax's Aunt Hessa states that humanity has always possessed certain minor psychic, dowsing, glamour and healing abilities, but that the powers the COLAs inherited from their mothers are expected to grow far beyond anything the Earth has ever seen before. She also claims that the ultimate purpose of the COLAs is to spread across the world and sire or bear gifted children of their own.

Powers
(several of the below list are only speculations by Gideon Reader who is speculating on Dax's ability, several others were included like slide projector and fax machine, these may be cola powers but cannot be verified as they were most likely a result of Gideon Reader messing around, as it was said he was trailing off )
Several examples of Cola powers include:

Dowsing
Clairvoyance
Clairaudience
Mediumship
Glamour (manifesting as either the ability to vanish from sight or the ability to create illusions)
Snake charming (mentioned only)
Levitation
Alchemy (mentioned only)
Telepathy
Empathy
Telekinesis
Teleportation (Olu only)
Pyrokinesis (Mia only)
Rune-reading (mentioned only) 
Palm-reading (mentioned only)
Soothsaying (mentioned only)
Astral projection 
Mimicry
Healing
Shapeshifting (in the case of Dax Jones and wolf only)
The ability to temporarily steal the powers of other Colas or leeching (in the case of Catherine Reader only)

Characters in children's literature